Archbishop's Palace, Charing, is an important heritage site dating back to the eighth century, and one of the earliest to be owned by the see of Canterbury. The current palace dates back to the late thirteenth century with later additions and rebuilding, notably under Archbishop John Morton in the late fifteenth century who 'made great building at Charing'. There was almost certainly an earlier hall on the site as the palace was said to be a favourite place for visits by Archbishop Dunstan (959-88) and Archbishop Thomas Becket (1162–70).

Charing was one of 17 medieval palaces in the possession of the archbishopric of Canterbury and the first in a string serving the archbishops' travels between Canterbury and London. Charing was visited by a number of royal guests, prominent among them being Henry VII and Henry VIII, both of whom paid several visits.

Notably Henry VIII and his first wife Catherine of Aragon stayed at the palace, together with their vast entourage numbering over 5,000, on their way to the Field of the Cloth of Gold in France in 1520.

The property was acquired by the Crown after the Dissolution of the Monasteries in 1545 and was subsequently leased to and owned by local farming gentry, notably the Honywoods and the Whelers. The present owner's family acquired the complex in the 1950s. In 1952, the palace was designated a scheduled monument and four of its buildings listed Grade I.

The Archbishop's Palace now features prominently, graded Priority Category A, on Historic England's Heritage at Risk Register.

In 2004, the Archbishop's Palace was a finalist in the BBC/Endemol TV series Restoration, presented by Griff Rhys Jones, Ptolemy Dean and Marianne Suhr, produced and directed by Paul Coueslant.

Efforts to preserve the Archbishop's Palace have recently been revived with the creation of the Charing Palace Trust, which is urgently seeking to raise the funds needed to acquire the endangered Great Hall, Archbishop's chambers, other associated buildings and the gardens. Its aim is to restore them and to make the site accessible to all as a community centre with new educational, public and leisure facilities.

References

Religious buildings and structures completed in 1348
Charing
History of Kent
1348 establishments in England